Walter William Andrade Zevallos (born 11 June 1982) is a Peruvian footballer who plays as a defender. He is currently a free agent.

Career
Andrade joined Peruvian Segunda División side Alfonso Ugarte in 2007, leaving three years later to join Unión Comercio of Copa Perú. Following promotion, he made his professional debut on 13 February 2011 during a Peruvian Primera División defeat to Alianza Lima. In his next appearance, in September 2011, Andrade scored his first goal against Cienciano. In total, he scored once in five matches during the 2011 season. He joined Carlos Mannucci in 2012, before signing for Walter Ormeño a year later. 2014 saw Andrade play for Deportivo Coopsol in the Segunda División, making seven appearances as the club finished second.

Career statistics
.

Honours
Unión Comercio
Copa Perú: 2010

References

External links

1982 births
Living people
Place of birth missing (living people)
Peruvian footballers
Association football defenders
Peruvian Segunda División players
Copa Perú players
Peruvian Primera División players
Alfonso Ugarte de Puno players
Unión Comercio footballers
Carlos A. Mannucci players
Walter Ormeño de Cañete players
Deportivo Coopsol players